Press Your Luck is an American television game show created by Bill Carruthers and Jan McCormack. The show features contestants answering trivia questions to earn "spins" on a randomly-generated game board with 18 slides. Spaces on the board correspond to cash, prizes, and the show's mascot, a cartoon creature known as the Whammy. Landing on the Whammy eliminates any cash and prizes accumulated to this point, while also displaying a short comedic animation. Its format is a revival of an earlier Carruthers production, Second Chance, which was hosted by Jim Peck and aired on ABC in 1977. The original version of Press Your Luck aired on CBS between 1983 and 1986. This version featured Peter Tomarken as host, Rod Roddy as announcer, and Carruthers as both director and the voice of the Whammy.

Following this version's cancellation, it aired frequently in reruns, first on USA Network and then on Game Show Network. Whammy! The All-New Press Your Luck, a revival of the series, aired from 2002 to 2003 also on Game Show Network with Todd Newton as host and Gary Kroeger as announcer. Various incarnations of the show have also aired in other countries as well. A weekly primetime version (reverting to the name Press Your Luck) began airing on ABC in 2019, with Elizabeth Banks as host and Neil Ross as both announcer and voice of the Whammy. The ABC version has aired for four seasons, with a fifth slated to begin in early 2023.

Gameplay
Three contestants compete on each episode. Gameplay general consists of four rounds: two question rounds and two "big board" rounds.

In a question round, contestants earn spins by correctly answering multiple-choice trivia questions. A contestant who rings in with the right answer before the multiple-choice options are given earns three spins; giving a correct answer after these options awards one spin. After the question round is completed, the "big board" round begins, with the contestants using all accumlated spins on the show's game board (18 spaces arranged in a 6×5 rectangle). Each space flashes randomly among cash amounts (sometimes with an extra spin), prizes, spaces which offer a change in direction or alteration to score, and the show's mascot, a red cartoon creature known as the "Whammy". The board is controlled by a randomly flashing light around the outside of each space, and contestants stop the board by hitting red buttons on their podiums. Landing on a space with a cash amount or prize awards that amount immediately. Should the board land on a Whammy space, the contestant loses all accumulated winnings and a short animation involving the Whammy is displayed to the viewing audience. Landing on a Whammy four times eliminates the player from the game (known as "Whammying out"). Directional spaces include "Across the Board", which chooses the space directly opposite; "Pick a Corner", which allows the contestant the choice of any corner space; and "Big Bucks", which redirects to the highest value on the board. Other spaces include "Add a One" (which automatically places a one as the outermost digit of the contestant's score) and an additional space which offers the option to take a cash amount or remove a Whammy if the contestant has previously landed on any.

Control of the Big Board begins with whichever contestant has earned the fewest spins in the question round. At any point after stopping the board, a contestant may choose to spin again (known as "press[ing] one's luck") or pass any remaining spins to whichever opponent has a higher score (or the opponent of that player's choice in the event of a tie). Spins earned by passing have to be played and cannot be passed a second time unless the player also lands on a Whammy. Play during the "big board" round ends when all accumulated spins have been exhausted.

The second half of the game also consists of a question round and a second "Big Board" round. The latter is started by whichever contestant has the lowest score, and the values on the board are higher than in the first round. On the 1983-86 version of the program, after all spins had been exhausted in the second "Big Board" round, the player with the highest score was declared the champion and given the right to continue playing on the next program; contestants could stay until they had won $25,000 (later increased to $50,000) or competed for five episodes, whichever came first. All players, winning or losing, received whatever cash and prizes were accumulated. On the 2019 version, only the highest scorer keeps any winnings and proceeds to the bonus round.

If two players have been eliminated and the remaining player still has spins, that player may choose to play "against the house" until all spins have been used or the player decides to stop voluntarily.

Bonus round
The 2019 revival features a bonus round not present in the original. In this round, the highest-scoring player proceeds to a final round of gameplay involving the game board. Here, the player is given five rounds of gameplay with five spins in the first round, four in the second, and three for every subsequent round. As in the main game, the board features cash amounts, directional spaces, and Whammys, as well as a selection of prizes tailored to the contestant. While winnings from the main game are not affected, hitting a Whammy at any point in the bonus game eliminates any additional winnings within the bonus round. If the player has an amount greater than $0 and has used every spin within an individual round, the player may choose to end gameplay and retain all winnings to that point or continue playing. As in the main game, this round also ends should the player hit a fourth Whammy. Exceeding $500,000 in this round automatically augments the player's final score to $1,000,000.

History

Press Your Luck is a revival of an earlier game show format created by producer Bill Carruthers, known as Second Chance. This show was hosted by Jim Peck and aired on ABC in 1977. Like Press Your Luck, it also featured contestants answering trivia questions to assume control of a randomly generated board with cash and prizes. This game board also featured spaces labeled with a devil-like creature called the Whammy, who would take away all cash and prizes if the contestant landed on one. Carruthers and Jan McCormack began developing Press Your Luck in 1983.

Peter Tomarken, prior to working in television, was an editor for Women's Wear Daily magazine. His first major television role came earlier in 1983 on the NBC game show Hit Man, and he was chosen to host Press Your Luck after the former was canceled. Press Your Luck began both tapings and airings in September 1983. The show premiered on September 19, 1983, on CBS at 10:30a.m. ET (9:30 CT/MT/PT), replacing Child's Play. Serving as announcer on the show was Rod Roddy, with whom Tomarken had previously worked on Hit Man, and who would later become known for announcing on The Price Is Right. John Harlan filled in on a few episodes when Roddy was unavailable. In addition to creating the show, Carruthers served as both director and the voice of the Whammy. The animations featuring this character were created by animator Savage Steve Holland; Carruthers personally selected Holland to design the character, and immediately liked Holland's first concept, which he sketched out on a napkin. Holland animated the character via computer software, thus making Press Your Luck one of the first game shows to use computer-designed graphics. Ed Flesh designed the show's set, and Lee Ringuette composed the show's music.

On January 6, 1986, CBS relocated Press Your Luck in order to make room for a Bob Eubanks-hosted revival of Card Sharks. Press Your Luck replaced Body Language in the network's 4:00p.m. afternoon time slot. Tomarken stated that by the end of 1985, the contract for The Price Is Right  was up for renewal, but CBS was unable to pay Mark Goodson Productions the kind of money they wanted to continue that show on their network. Goodson came up with the solution of taking over the 10:30a.m. timeslot. The last episode of the CBS version aired on September 26, 1986. The final tapings took place in August of that same year, when its cancellation was first announced. Following the cancellation, Tomarken went on to host a number of other game shows including the syndicated show Wipeout in 1988-89, as well as a number of infomercials. He and his wife both died in 2006 when a private plane he was piloting crashed in Santa Monica Bay.

Michael Larson

Press Your Luck gained media attention in 1984 for the winnings of a contestant named Michael Larson. A self-described unemployed ice cream truck driver from Lebanon, Ohio, he applied to be on the show that year. By recording episodes at home on a videocassette recorder and playing them back frame-by-frame, Larson discovered that the presumed random patterns of the game board were not actually random and he was able to memorize the sequences. On the single game in which he appeared, an initially tentative Larson spun a Whammy on his very first turn, but then went 45 consecutive spins without hitting another one. The majority of his spins landed on the highest-valued spaces, which offered $3,000, $4,000, or $5,000 and an extra spin. The game ran for so long that CBS aired the episode in two parts, on June 8 and 11, 1984. In the end, Larson earned a total of $110,237 in cash and prizes.

After an investigation, CBS executives concluded that Larson's memorization of the board patterns did not constitute cheating and allowed him to keep his winnings. The board was then reprogrammed with up to 32 new patterns to prevent subsequent contestants from duplicating his feat. In 1994, TV Guide magazine interviewed Larson and revealed the background of this episode including his decision to pass his remaining spins after he lost concentration and missed his target squares.

The story was featured in a two-hour documentary on Game Show Network titled Big Bucks: The Press Your Luck Scandal in March 2003. In July 2010, Michael's brother James, and his former wife at the time of winning, were interviewed for PRI's This American Life for the episode "Million Dollar Idea". His story was also featured on the first episode of Game Show Network's documentary series Cover Story in 2018.

Rebroadcasts, syndication, and digital television networks
In early 1987, 130 episodes of the show were packaged by Republic Pictures for off-network syndication to a handful of local stations. These episodes originally aired on CBS from February 25 to August 23, 1985, and were also the first to be shown on USA Network from September 14, 1987 to December 30, 1988. Press Your Luck remained on its schedule until October 13, 1995, when USA dropped its game show block altogether.

Game Show Network aired the show from September 2001 to March 2009, airing episodes from February 1984 to November 1985. Game Show Network resumed airing the show in 2012, airing episodes from the September 1983 premiere to February 1984. From 2014 to 2016, Game Show Network aired episodes 561 to 696, which originally ran from November 1985 to May 1986; after this, GSN aired episodes from the 1984 to February 1985 until the show was removed from Game Show Network's schedule again in May 2017. From December 2017 to February 2018, Game Show Network aired episodes from 1984 as part of a Saturday night game show block.

On July 2, 2018, reruns of Press Your Luck started airing on GameTV in Canada.

Whammy! The All-New Press Your Luck

On April 15, 2002, Game Show Network debuted a revival titled Whammy! The All-New Press Your Luck, with Todd Newton as host and Gary Kroeger as announcer. This incarnation of the show featured similar gameplay to the original, and was described by Game Show Network executives as being a modern incarnation of the show. One feature unique to this revival was the addition of a "Double Whammy", which would not only remove all cash and prizes accumulated by the contestant, but also subject the contestant to a physical stunt such as having objects drop from the ceiling.

Press Your Luck (2019–present, ABC)

On February 21, 2019, a casting announcement was released by Fremantle for a new version of Press Your Luck advertising opportunities for potential contestants to apply. American Broadcasting Company confirmed in early 2019 that the network was partnering with Fremantle to reboot the series, with pre-production on new hour-long episodes of Press Your Luck and Card Sharks already underway and taping slated to begin sometime in the first portion of the year. John Quinn (a producer on Celebrity Name Game) is the executive producer. Actress Elizabeth Banks was selected to host. Neil Ross is the announcer on the ABC version, in addition to providing the voice of the Whammy.

The series premiered on June 12, 2019 following an early premiere the day before. The first season featured eight weekly hour-long episodes.

International versions

Since its inception, Press Your Luck has also been adapted internationally. An Australian version, with Ian Turpie as host and John Deeks as announcer, on Seven Network from 1987 to 1988. Grundy Worldwide packaged this version, with Bill Mason as executive producer. A German version entitled Glück am Drücker ("Good Luck on the Trigger") aired on RTLplus in 1992 with Al Munteanu as host. It had an animated vulture named "Raffi" steal cash and prizes from contestants instead of Whammys. Another remake, Drück Dein Glück ("Push Your Luck"), aired daily in 1999 on RTL II with Guido Kellerman as host; this show's mascot was an animated shark. In the United Kingdom, an ITV version ran for two seasons from June 6, 1991 to September 20, 1992 on ITV in the HTV West region, with Paul Coia as host. The show was canceled following the second season due to budget cuts that resulted from the ITV franchise auctions of 1991, as well as lower ratings figures.

Whammy! The All-New Press Your Luck was also adapted in the Philippines as Whammy! Push Your Luck on GMA Network from 2007 to 2008. It was hosted by Paolo Bediones and Rufa Mae Quinto.

Merchandise
In 1988, GameTek released a home computer game of Press Your Luck for IBM PC compatibles and the Commodore 64. Ludia Inc. (now part of RTL Group, which owns the show franchise) along with Ubisoft released an adaptation called Press Your Luck: 2010 Edition on October 27, 2009 for PC, iPhone, iPad, iPod Touch, Nintendo DS, and Wii. Prior to this, on August 24, 2010, the game was released for the PlayStation 3 (via PSN) as part of the Game Show Party bundle pack (PS3 only) that also included Family Feud: 2010 Edition and The Price is Right: 2010 Edition, and on PlayStation 3's PSN download service from August 24, 2010.

A video game adaption of the show titled Press Your Luck 2010 Edition was released in the U.S. on multiple home consoles and with a PC version. Actor Terry McGovern is the off-screen host. A dsots game based on the 2019 format was also released, with game play featuring a slot machine and the Big Board bonus game.

In January 2012, an app developed by Fremantle subsidiary Ludia and based on Press Your Luck debuted on Facebook. Ten contestants compete in a single-question round together, all answering the same multiple-choice questions. There are six questions in total, each worth between $500 and $1,000, or a Whammy. A correct answer earns the question's value multiplied by the number of contestants who answered incorrectly or ran out of time (e.g., answering the $500 question correctly with three other contestants answering incorrectly earns $1,500). Bonus cash is given to the three contestants who answer the questions correctly in the shortest amount of time. Answering the Whammy question incorrectly causes the contestant to lose any money accumulated to that point.

In September 2012, Ludia released Press Your Luck Slots on Facebook.

References

External links

 Official Website (ABC Version)
  (1983–86) (US)
  (1987–88) (Australia)
  (2019) (US)

1983 American television series debuts
1986 American television series endings
1980s American game shows
2010s American game shows
2020s American game shows
2019 American television series debuts
American Broadcasting Company original programming
CBS original programming
English-language television shows
Television series by CBS Studios
Television series by Brownstone Productions
Television series by Fremantle (company)
American television series revived after cancellation
1980s Australian game shows
1990s British game shows
American television series with live action and animation
Television series revived after cancellation